When a Dog Loves a Cat (Traditional Chinese: 當狗愛上貓) is a TVB modern drama series broadcast in July 2008.

Synopsis 
Promise you love me, honor and keep me, 
For better or worse, in sickness and in health.

Miu Chun (Gallen Lo) was once diagnosed with cancer, and became really depressed. Cheung Ka-Ka (Tracy Ip), a nurse, comforted him and later became his girlfriend. Soon after he recovered, the two adopted a cat, Can Can, and a dog, 大巴 (Dai Ba). One day 大巴 ran across a road, Ka-Ka tried to rescue the dog from an oncoming car but died in the accident herself. From that day on Chun hated dogs and abandoned Dai Ba.

Chow Chi-Yu (Myolie Wu) found 大巴 wandering on the streets and brought him back to her father's kennel. However, 大巴 carried a deadly virus and killed all the dogs at the kennel. Since then, Yu's father became employed with the pound to catch abandoned dogs. Her brother, Chow Chi-Jim (David Lui), and sister-in-law, Shui Tin-Lan (Margie Tsang) opened a pet shop to earn money for the family.

Yu starts her first day of work at Raptor Advertising Company alongside her boyfriend, Carson Ying Hoi-Leung (Raymond Wong) and Chun. Later, Yu finds Siu Ba(小巴), Dai Ba's brother, on the street, and brings him back to the company and promotes him as their advertising icon. Chun was forced to take Siu Ba home and discovers that dogs are not as bad as he thought.

Carson is caught cheating with another woman, and soon Yu and Chun develop a relationship. Kit Man Chi-Kei (Bernice Liu), the boss' daughter, returns from the United States and is given full responsibility of Raptor. Kit is always finding ways to disturb and annoy Chun. He discovers that she secretly has a crush on him. Chun needs to make the decision of which women to be with but is faced with the tragic news of his cancer reappearing.

Chun soon gets used to Siu Ba and starts having a love for dogs. When he first met Siu Ba he was very cruel and rude to him, but he grew on the love when Siu Ba got more attached to Chun. He then let Siu Ba live with him, which made Chow Chow happy.

Cast

Viewership ratings

Awards and nominations
41st TVB Anniversary Awards (2008)
 "Best Drama"

References

External links
TVB.com When a Dog Loves a Cat - Official Website 
K for TVB.net When a Dog Loves a Cat - Episodic Synopsis and Screen Captures 

TVB dramas
2008 Hong Kong television series debuts
2008 Hong Kong television series endings